Charles David Ayers, Jr. (born July 5, 1966) is an American chef, cookbook author, and restaurateur. He is the former executive chef for Google, from 1999 until 2006. His work there was widely publicized in the media, and David Vise's corporate history The Google Story contains an entire chapter about him called "Charlie's Place." By the time he left Google in 2006, Ayers and his team of five chefs and 150 employees were serving 4,000 daily lunches and dinners in 10 cafes across the company's headquarters campus in Mountain View, California.

Background

Ayers was born on July 5, 1966, in Chicago and he grew up in Brooklyn, New York and Parsippany, New Jersey. He graduated from Parsippany High School in 1985.

He worked as a private and personal chef to the band the Grateful Dead in the 1980s. Ayers began his professional career in New Jersey working for Hilton Hotels, at their Meadowlands and Parsippany locations in New Jersey. 

Later he left Hilton to attend culinary school in Providence, Rhode Island at Johnson & Wales University. He graduated from Johnson & Wales in 1990. He cooked at several restaurants in the Providence and Boston areas, before moving to California. 

He worked as a chef at Silicon Valley restaurants in the 1990s, including Stoddard's Brewhouse in Sunnyvale; as well as at Left at Albuquerque, Blue Chalk Cafe, and the Peninsula Creamery (later known as the Palo Alto Creamery) all in downtown Palo Alto.

Ayers worked at Google at the Mountain View, California headquarters as an executive chef, from 1999 until 2006. He got the job at Google by winning a cook-off, after being judged by the company's then 40 employees. Ayers reportedly earned $26 million (USD) from his Google stock options.

Ayers started Calafia Café / Calafia Market a Go Go, in operation from January 20, 2009, until August 2018, and it was located at the Town & Country Village shopping center in Palo Alto, California. The financing to open Calafia Café came from former Google employees and a couple that worked for Cisco Systems Inc.

Publications

References

External links
 Chef Charlie Ayers' home page
 Calafia restaurant website
 Calafia Restaurant Review

American male chefs
American chefs
Living people
Parsippany High School alumni
People from Parsippany-Troy Hills, New Jersey
People from the San Francisco Bay Area
Cuisine of the San Francisco Bay Area
1966 births
Google people
People from Palo Alto, California